Binangkal is a type of doughnut from the islands of Visayas and Mindanao in the Philippines. It is made from deep-fried dense dough balls coated with sesame seeds. It is usually eaten with hot chocolate or coffee.

The name is derived from bangkal, the local Cebuano common name for the Leichhardt tree (Nauclea orientalis) which bears spherical flowers and fruits.

See also

 Shakoy
 Pilipit
 List of doughnut varieties
 List of sesame seed dishes

References

External links

Philippine desserts
Sesame dishes
Doughnuts
Philippine breads